Robat (also Romanized as Robāţ) is a village in Baghin Rural District, in the Central District of Kerman County, Kerman Province, Iran. At the 2006 census, its population was 1,755, in 423 families.

References 

Populated places in Kerman County